Mönchgut-Granitz is an Amt in the district of Vorpommern-Rügen, in Mecklenburg-Vorpommern, Germany. The seat of the Amt is in Baabe.

The Amt Mönchgut-Granitz consists of the following municipalities:
Baabe
Göhren
Lancken-Granitz
Mönchgut
Sellin
Zirkow

References

Ämter in Mecklenburg-Western Pomerania
Rügen